Ruth Wexler is an American industrial chemist best known as a co-discoverer of apixaban, a marketed anticoagulant; and losartan, a blood pressure treatment.

Education 
Wexler received her B.A. in Chemistry from Boston University in 1977, and a Ph.D. in organic chemistry working with Amos B. Smith at the University of Pennsylvania in 1982.

Research 
Wexler started her career at DuPont in 1982, rising to Executive Director in 1998. She then joined Bristol-Myers Squibb as an Executive Director in 2001, moving eventually to New Jersey to head their cardiovascular research unit. She has worked on targets involved in apoptosis, inflammation, obesity, and coagulation. As of 2018, she has over 215 original research publications.

Awards 

 2015 - E.B. Hershberg Award for Discoveries in Medicinally Active Substances
 2014 - Inducted into the ACS MEDI Hall of Fame
 2011 - BMS Ondetti and Cushman Award
 2004 - Outstanding New Jersey Woman in Research

References 

Living people
Year of birth missing (living people)
American women chemists
Organic chemists
Boston University College of Arts and Sciences alumni
University of Pennsylvania alumni
21st-century American women